The western cryptic gehyra (Gehyra crypta) is a species of gecko in the genus Gehyra. It is endemic to Western Australia. It was first described in 2018.

References

Gehyra
Reptiles described in 2018
Geckos of Australia